Green Paper on Constitutional Development is a consultation document released by the Government of Hong Kong Special Administration Region (HKSAR) on 11 July 2007. This is the first "green paper" released by the HKSAR since its establishment. The consultation period went until 11 October 2007.

The focus of this Green Paper is on political reform within the framework of the Hong Kong Basic Law, particularly the methods in which the Chief Executive (CE) and the Legislative Council (LegCo) are elected and the timetable in which these reforms will take place.

Contents 

The following are the options provided by the Green Paper in regard to electing the CE.

On the size on the nominating committee, the options are:

 Fewer than 800 members (60 of which are LegCo members)
 800 members
 More than 800 members

On the number of candidates, the options are:

 10 or more (requiring less than 12.5% of the nomination by the Election Committee)
 At most 8 (requiring 12.5% of the nomination by the Election Committee)
 2 to 4  (requiring 25% of the nomination by the Election Committee)

On the roadmap and timetable for implementing universal suffrage for electing the CE, the options are:

 As early as 2012
 A "transitional phase" in the 2012 election and attaining universal suffrage in 2017
 After 2017

The following are the options provided by the Green Paper with regard to reforming the LegCo:

 Replace functional constituencies seats with district-based seats returned through direct election
 Retaining functional constituencies seats, but change the electoral method
 Increase the number of seats representing District Councils in LegCo

On the roadmap and timetable for implementing universal suffrage for LegCo, the options are:

 Directly in 2012
 In phases in 2016
 In phases after 2016

See also 

 Politics of Hong Kong
 Consultation Document on the Methods for Selecting the Chief Executive and for Forming the LegCo in 2012

External links 
 Public Consultation on the Green Paper on Constitutional Development

Politics of Hong Kong
Electoral reform in Hong Kong